Raphael Gamaliel Warnock (born July 23, 1969) is an American Baptist pastor and politician serving as the junior United States senator from Georgia since 2021. A member of the Democratic Party, he assumed office on January 20, 2021.

Since 2005, Warnock has been the senior pastor of Atlanta's Ebenezer Baptist Church. He was the senior pastor of Douglas Memorial Community Church until 2005. Warnock came to prominence in Georgia politics as a leading activist in the campaign to expand Medicaid in the state under the Affordable Care Act.

On January 30, 2020, Warnock announced his candidacy in Georgia's 2020 United States Senate special election, seeking to unseat incumbent Republican Kelly Loeffler. No candidate received a majority of the vote on election day, so Warnock faced Loeffler again in a January 5, 2021, runoff election, which he won by more than 93,000 votes. With Warnock's win and Jon Ossoff's victory in the concurrent regularly scheduled election, the Democratic Party won control of the Senate for the first time since 2014.

Warnock and Ossoff are the first Democrats elected to the U.S. Senate from Georgia since Zell Miller in 2000. Warnock is the first African American to represent Georgia in the Senate, and the first Black Democrat elected to the Senate in a Southern state. He was reelected to a full term in 2022, defeating Republican nominee Herschel Walker.

Early life and education
Warnock was born in Savannah, Georgia, on July 23, 1969. He grew up in public housing as the eleventh of twelve children born to Verlene and Jonathan Warnock, both Pentecostal pastors. His father served in the U.S. Army during World War II, where he learned automobile mechanics and welding, and subsequently opened a small car restoration business where he restored junked cars for resale. His mother picked cotton and tobacco in the summers in Waycross, Georgia, as a teenager and became a pastor.

Warnock graduated from Sol C. Johnson High School in 1987, and having wanted to follow in the footsteps of Martin Luther King Jr., attended Morehouse College, from which he graduated cum laude in 1991 with a Bachelor of Arts degree in psychology. He credits his participation in the Upward Bound program for making him college-ready, as he was able to enroll in early college courses through Savannah State University. He then earned Master of Divinity, Master of Philosophy, and Doctor of Philosophy degrees from Union Theological Seminary, a school affiliated with Columbia University.

Religious work

Warnock began his ministry as an intern and licentiate at the Sixth Avenue Baptist church in Birmingham, Alabama, under the civil rights movement leader John Thomas Porter. In the 1990s, he served as youth pastor and then assistant pastor at Abyssinian Baptist Church in New York. While Warnock was pastor at Abyssinian, the church declined to hire workfare recipients as part of organized opposition to then-mayor Rudy Giuliani's workfare program. The church also hosted Fidel Castro on October 22, 1995, while Warnock was youth pastor. There is no evidence Warnock was involved in that decision. During the 2020–21 United States Senate special election in Georgia, his campaign refused to say whether Warnock attended the event.

In the 2000s, Warnock was senior pastor at Douglas Memorial Community Church in Baltimore, Maryland, for four and a half years. He and an assistant minister were arrested and charged with obstructing a police investigation into suspected child abuse at a summer camp the church ran. The police report called Warnock "extremely uncooperative and disruptive". Warnock had demanded that the counselors have lawyers present when being interviewed by police. The charges were later dropped with the deputy state's attorney's acknowledgment that it had been a "miscommunication", adding that Warnock had aided the investigation and that prosecution would be a waste of resources. Warnock said he was merely asserting that lawyers should be present during the interviews and that he had intervened to ensure that an adult was present while a juvenile suspect was being questioned.

In 2005, Warnock became senior pastor of the Ebenezer Baptist Church in Atlanta, Georgia, Martin Luther King Jr.'s former congregation; he is the fifth and the youngest person to serve as Ebenezer's senior pastor since its founding. He has continued in the post while serving in the Senate.

As pastor, Warnock advocated for clemency for Troy Davis, who was executed in 2011. In 2013, he delivered the benediction at the public prayer service at the second inauguration of Barack Obama. After Fidel Castro died in 2016, Warnock told his church to pray for the Cuban people, calling Castro's legacy "complex, kind of like America's legacy is complex". In March 2019, Warnock hosted an interfaith meeting on climate change at his church, featuring Al Gore and William Barber II. He presided at Representative John Lewis's funeral at Ebenezer Church in July 2020.

On Easter Sunday 2021, Warnock's Twitter account tweeted, "The meaning of Easter is more transcendent than the resurrection of Jesus Christ. Whether you are a Christian or not, through a commitment to helping others we are able to save ourselves." Some conservative Christians and political commenters criticized the tweet, including Benjamin Watson, Allie Beth Stuckey, and Jenna Ellis, who called it "heretical". The tweet was deleted that afternoon, with a spokesperson for Warnock saying, "the tweet was posted by staff and was not approved" but declining to say whether it reflected Warnock's beliefs.

Political activism

Warnock came to prominence in Georgia politics as a leader in the campaign to expand Medicaid in the state. In March 2014, Warnock led a sit-in at the Georgia State Capitol to press state legislators to accept the expansion of Medicaid offered by the Patient Protection and Affordable Care Act. He and other leaders were arrested during the protest. Warnock also actively campaigned for Georgia Democrats to increase outreach to low-income communities. In 2015, Warnock considered running in the 2016 election for the United States Senate seat held by Johnny Isakson as a member of the Democratic Party. He opted not to run.

From June 2017 to January 2020, Warnock chaired the New Georgia Project, a nonpartisan organization focused on increasing voter registration.

Warnock supports expanding the Affordable Care Act and has called for the passage of the John Lewis Voting Rights Act. He also supports increasing COVID-19-relief funding. A proponent of abortion rights and gay marriage, he has been endorsed by Planned Parenthood. He opposes the concealed carry of firearms, saying that religious leaders do not want guns in places of worship. Warnock has long opposed the death penalty.

U.S. Senate

Elections

2020–21 Special

In January 2020, Warnock decided to run in the 2020 special election for the United States Senate seat held by Kelly Loeffler, who was appointed after Johnny Isakson's resignation. Stacey Abrams encouraged him to run and coordinated his support from Democratic leadership. He was endorsed by Democratic senators Chuck Schumer, Cory Booker, Sherrod Brown, Kirsten Gillibrand, Jeff Merkley, Chris Murphy, Bernie Sanders, Brian Schatz, and Elizabeth Warren, the Democratic Senatorial Campaign Committee, Stacey Abrams, and former presidents Barack Obama and Jimmy Carter. Several players of the Atlanta Dream, a WNBA team Loeffler co-owned at the time, wore shirts endorsing Warnock in response to controversial comments Loeffler made about the Black Lives Matter movement.

The closing argument of Warnock's campaign focused on the $2,000 stimulus payments that he and Ossoff would approve if they were elected, giving Democrats a Senate majority.

In the January 5 runoff election, Warnock defeated Loeffler with 51.04% of the vote. With this victory, he became the first African American to represent Georgia in the Senate, the first Black Democratic U.S. senator elected in the South, and the first Black Democrat elected to the Senate by a former state of the Confederacy. Warnock and Ossoff are the first Democrats elected to the U.S. Senate from Georgia since Zell Miller in 2000. On January 7, Loeffler conceded. The election result was certified on January 19.

2022

On January 27, 2021, Warnock announced that he would seek election to a full term in 2022.

Since no candidate received a majority of the vote in the general election on November 8, 2022, Warnock faced Walker in a runoff election on December 6, and won. He became the first Georgia Democrat to win reelection to the Senate since Sam Nunn in 1990 and the first Deep South Democrat to win reelection to the Senate since Mary Landrieu of Louisiana in 2008.

Tenure

On January 20, 2021, Warnock was sworn into the United States Senate in the 117th Congress by Vice President Kamala Harris.

Warnock voted to convict former president Donald Trump for his role in inciting the Capitol riots on February 13, 2021.

On March 5, 2021, he co-sponsored an amendment to raise the minimum wage to $15 an hour, along with 29 other Democratic and independent senators.

On March 17, 2021, he delivered his first speech on the Senate floor, in support of the passage of the For the People Act and the John Lewis Voting Rights Act.

In January 2022, when former U.S. senator Johnny Isakson died, Warnock introduced a Senate resolution to honor Isakson, which was enacted with bipartisan support, while commenting that Isakson was "a patriot, a public servant" who "knew how to show up for people".

In October 2022, a bill by Warnock and Senator Jon Ossoff was enacted into law, naming a United States Post Office building in Atlanta, Georgia after John Lewis, who was a U.S. representative for Atlanta until his death in 2020.

Committee assignments
Warnock has been assigned to the following committees for the 117th United States Congress:
 Committee on Agriculture, Nutrition, and Forestry
Subcommittee on Commodities, Risk Management, and Trade (Chair)
Subcommittee on Food and Nutrition, Specialty Crops, Organics, and Research
Subcommittee on Livestock, Dairy, Poultry, Local Food Systems, and Food Safety and Security
 Committee on Commerce, Science, and Transportation
Subcommittee on Aviation Safety, Operations, and Innovation
Subcommittee on Communications, Media, and Broadband
Subcommittee on Space and Science
Subcommittee on Surface Transportation, Maritime, Freight, and Ports
 Committee on Banking, Housing, and Urban Affairs
Subcommittee on Securities, Insurance, and Investment
Subcommittee on Housing, Transportation, and Community Development
Subcommittee on Financial Institutions and Consumer Protection (Chair)
 Congressional Joint Economic Committee
 Special Committee on Aging

Caucuses

 Congressional Black Caucus

Political positions 

As a U.S. senator, Warnock has embraced a progressive agenda. As of December 2022, Warnock had voted in line with President Joe Biden's stated position 96.5% of the time.

Abortion
Warnock has described himself as a "pro-choice pastor".

In December 2020, during Warnock's Senate campaign, a group of 25 Black ministers wrote him an open letter asking him to reconsider his abortion stance, calling it "contrary to Christian teachings" and saying abortion disproportionately affects African Americans. The Warnock campaign responded with a statement, writing that "Warnock believes a patient's room is too small a place for a woman, her doctor, and the US government and that these are deeply personal health care decisions – not political ones."

Warnock called the June 2022 overturning of Roe v. Wade "misguided" and "devastating for women and families in Georgia and nationwide."

Agriculture
Warnock is the main sponsor of S.278 - Emergency Relief for Farmers of Color Act of 2021. The bill would aid historically disaffected minority groups in the agriculture sector.

Warnock worked with Senator Tommy Tuberville to reduce barriers to trade for peanut exports, to assist peanut farmers in Georgia.

Capital punishment and criminal justice
Warnock opposes the death penalty. He unsuccessfully attempted to stop death row inmate Troy Davis's execution.

Defense 

After President Joe Biden recommended in March 2022 that the Air National Guard's Combat Readiness Training Center in Savannah, Georgia, be closed, Warnock was one of several Georgia lawmakers to oppose the move, calling Biden's recommendation "bad for Savannah and bad for our national security"; the Appropriations subcommittee of the House of Representatives rejected the recommendation in June 2022.

Warnock supported the National Defense Authorization Act for Fiscal Year 2022, which provides funding for defense purposes, saying: "Georgia is an important military state ... Fort Stewart will get an upgrade in its energy plant to the tune of $22 million. There is also $100 million in this bill for barracks at Fort Stewart. We have to make sure that those who we ask to serve have what they need in order to serve". The barracks are slated to house over 370 soldiers.

Economy and infrastructure

Warnock worked together with Senator Ted Cruz to introduce legislation to prioritize the building of Interstate 14 connecting Augusta, Macon, and Columbus in Georgia to Texas; Warnock said the interstate would be "helpful for our military installations" and "for the economy in this region". The prioritization was ultimately approved within the Infrastructure Investment and Jobs Act that passed in November 2021, with the interstate slated to also pass through Midland–Odessa, Texas; Alexandria, Louisiana; Laurel, Mississippi; and Montgomery, Alabama.

Warnock has helped to obtain millions in funding for the Port of Savannah and for the new Northeast Georgia Inland Port in Hall County, Georgia.

Warnock supports raising the federal minimum wage to $15 an hour.

Environment 
In 2022, Warnock emphasized the importance of the national climate bill within his campaign. Warnock referenced the contaminated water and air in Black and brown communities, such as the water crises in Jackson, Mississippi, and Flint, Michigan, and the burden placed on low-income families that pay a larger portion of their income on utilities.

After attending a groundbreaking at Hyundai's electric vehicle plant in Savannah, Georgia alongside Brian Kemp, Warnock told reporters that climate policy is a "moral" issue. He said, "I've also put forward a lot of legislation focused on creating a green energy future, everything from electric vehicles to electric batteries being manufactured in the state to investing in solar manufacturing".

Warnock was a cosponsor of the Recycling Infrastructure and Accessibility Act of 2022, a bipartisan bill that "requires the Environmental Protection Agency (EPA) to establish a pilot grant program for improving recycling accessibility in communities".

Gun control 
Warnock received a grade of "F" from the National Rifle Association Political Victory Fund during his Senate campaign. The NRA accused him of supporting the criminalization of private gun transfers and banning standard issue magazines, and endorsed Loeffler. In 2014, Warnock gave a sermon in which he criticized Georgia's gun laws, saying that "somebody decided that they had the bright idea to pass a piece of legislation that would allow guns and concealed weapons to be carried in churches. Have you ever been to a church meeting?... Whoever thought of that had never been to a church meeting."

Healthcare 

In October 2021, Warnock and Ossoff said that they had acquired federal funding under the American Rescue Plan for health centers across Georgia, including two in Macon and four in Albany, each of which received between $500,000 to $1,100,000. Reacting to this, Warnock affirmed his support for the American Rescue Plan, saying: "We must continue to do all we can to provide support and funding to our health care infrastructure and workers on the front lines of this pandemic."

A bipartisan bill on maternal health by Warnock and Senator Marco Rubio was incorporated into a $1.5 trillion federal spending package that passed Congress in March 2022. Warnock's bill allocated $50 million for integrated healthcare services grants, $45 million to innovation grants, $25 million for training of healthcare workers, and approval of a study on how to teach health professionals to reduce discrimination. Warnock said, "Georgia is dead last when it comes to women and their access to healthcare" and that the bill's aim was "to make sure that when women are trying to bring a child in this world, they don't have to do so with one foot in the grave".

In August 2022, the Senate passed the Inflation Reduction Act, which included two proposals by Warnock: a $2,000 annual limit on prescription drug costs for seniors on Medicare, and a $35 monthly limit on insulin costs for people on Medicare. Republican lawmakers removed a third proposal by Warnock that would have imposed a $35 monthly limit on out-of-pocket insulin costs for people on private insurance.

Immigration
Warnock criticized Trump's "shithole countries" comment in 2018 and his subsequent signing of a proclamation honoring Martin Luther King Jr., saying, "I would argue that a proclamation without an apology is hypocrisy. There is no redemption without repentance and the president of the United States needs to repent."

Warnock also has supported keeping Title 42 expulsions, saying, "We need assurances that we have security at the border and that we protect communities on this side of the border."

LGBT rights
Warnock supports the Equality Act, which would prohibit discrimination based on gender identity and sexual orientation. Warnock also supports the Respect for Marriage Act, which would codify same-sex and interracial marriages.

Supreme Court
Warnock twice declined to answer when asked whether he supported "packing the Supreme Court" by adding additional justices during a December 2020 debate.

Veterans and military families 

In June 2021, Warnock and Ossoff assisted six Georgia organizations that work to reduce veteran homelessness by obtaining between $375,000 to $500,000 of federal funds for each organization, using funds from the Department of Labor's Homeless Veterans' Reintegration Program, which are intended to help the veterans find jobs.

In September 2021, Warnock worked together with Senator Cindy Hyde-Smith to introduce legislation designating September 19 to 25 as Gold Star Families Remembrance Week nationwide, to honor sacrifices made by families of servicemen who died serving the United States; the legislation passed the Senate unanimously.

In November 2021, a bill of Warnock's was enacted that approved a government study into whether there were racial disparities in benefits provided by the United States Department of Veterans Affairs.

Voting rights 
In his maiden speech on the U.S. Senate floor, Warnock said one of his primary goals upon assuming office was to oppose voting restrictions and support federal voting reforms. He has said that passing legislation to expand voting rights is important enough to end the Senate filibuster.

On March 17, 2021, Warnock said in a Senate floor speech that voting rights were under attack at a rate not seen since the Jim Crow era. On April 20, 2021, Warnock and voting rights activist Stacey Abrams testified before the Senate Judiciary Committee in favor of passing the John Lewis Voting Rights Act and For the People Act. He was again critical of the new election laws passed in his home state, calling it a "full-fledged assault on voting rights, unlike anything we seen since the era of Jim Crow." He is not opposed to voter ID laws, but criticizes them when they discriminate against certain groups.

Welfare 
Warnock opposed New York mayor Rudy Giuliani's workfare reforms while he was assistant pastor at Abyssinian Baptist Church. In 1997, he told The New York Times, "We are worried that workfare is being used to displace other workers who receive respectable compensation... We are concerned that poor people are being put into competition with other poor people, and in that respect, we think workfare is a hoax".

Personal life
Warnock lives in Atlanta. He married Oulèye Ndoye in a public ceremony on February 14, 2016; the couple had held a private ceremony in January. They have two children. The couple separated in November 2019, and their divorce was finalized in 2020.

In March 2020, when Warnock and Ndoye were going through divorce proceedings, Ndoye accused Warnock of running over her foot with his car during a verbal argument; Warnock denied the accusation. According to a Atlanta Police Department report, after Warnock called police to the scene, Ndoye was reluctant to show her foot to the responding police officer, who "did not see any signs that Ms. Ouleye's foot was ran over"; medical professionals then arrived at the scene, but were "not able to locate any swelling, redness, or bruising or broken bones" on Ndoye's foot. Police did not charge Warnock with any crimes regarding the incident.

In February 2022, Ndoye asked the court to modify their child custody agreement, granting her "additional custody of their two young children so she can complete a Harvard University program", and for a recalculation of child support payments.

In October 2022, Savannah's city government honorarily renamed Cape Street, the street where Warnock grew up in public housing during the 1980s, Raphael Warnock Way.

Electoral history

Publications
 
 
 OCLC 1281244406.

See also
 List of African-American firsts
 List of African-American United States senators
 List of Christian clergy in politics

References

External links

Senator Raphael Warnock official U.S. Senate website
Warnock for Georgia  campaign website
Biography at the Ebenezer Baptist Church

|-

|-

|-

1969 births
20th-century Baptist ministers from the United States
21st-century African-American politicians
21st-century American male writers
21st-century American politicians
21st-century Baptist ministers from the United States
Activists for African-American civil rights
Activists from Atlanta
African-American activists
African-American Baptist ministers
African-American non-fiction writers
African-American people in Georgia (U.S. state) politics
African-American theologians
African-American United States senators
American anti-poverty advocates
Baptist writers
Baptists from Georgia (U.S. state)
Clergy from Atlanta
Democratic Party United States senators from Georgia (U.S. state)
Georgia (U.S. state) Democrats
Living people
Morehouse College alumni
Nonviolence advocates
Politicians from Atlanta
Politicians from Savannah, Georgia
Union Theological Seminary (New York City) alumni
Writers from Atlanta
Writers from Savannah, Georgia